Altheim is a municipality in the district of Alb-Donau in Baden-Württemberg, Germany.

History
In the 13th century, Altheim was a possession of the Lordship of Steußlingen. After World War II, Altheim, still a haufendorf with two separate town centers, began an urban spread to the west.

Geography
Altheim is a municipality (Gemeinde) of the Alb-Donau district of Baden-Württemberg, one of the 16 states of the Federal Republic of Germany. It is physically located in the  region, so named for a historic road that runs through the municipality from west to east.

Coat of arms
Altheim's coat of arms displays three plates upon a field of blue. At the top of the blazon is a white chief and upon that a blue, engrailed and invected line. This coat of arms was first adopted by the municipal council of Altheim on 3 March 1937 with permission from its owner, Baron Conrad von Freyberg, head of a local noble house that had lived in the area since 1528. A request to for approval of official use of this coat of arms was sent to the Reichsstatthalter of Württemberg, though approval did not materialize. A modified version was used through World War II, with the field behind the roundels was turned black and a yellow chief containing a black stag antler. On 24 August 1957, the Federal Ministry of the Interior approved the Freyberg coat of arms, but changed the chief to its current state as a reference to Altheim's 13th century owners, the Lords of Steußlingen. A municipal flag was issued alongside the official coat of arms.

References

Alb-Donau-Kreis
Württemberg